The 51st Annual Country Music Association Awards, commonly known as the 51st CMA Awards, was held on November 8, 2017, at the Bridgestone Arena in Nashville, Tennessee and was hosted for the tenth time by Brad Paisley and Carrie Underwood.

The nominations  were announced on September 4, 2017, on Good Morning America by Lauren Alaina, Dustin Lynch, and Brothers Osborne.

Winners and nominees
Note: The winners are shown in Bold.

Special Recognition Awards
The CMA Special Recognition Award recipients were announced on 4 April 2017.

Performers

Presenters

Critical Reception
The 51st Annual CMA Awards received 14.29 million viewers, the highest ratings since 2014 (which received 16.1 million. Among adults 18–49, the show received a 3.2 rating, up from the 2.9 rating of the previous year.

The ceremony was noted for its parody of political subject matter in awards shows, specifically in the opening monologue by Brad Paisley and Carrie Underwood, who told jokes referencing both Hillary Clinton and Donald Trump. Paisley also performed a parody song about Trump's tweeting habits to the tune of Underwood's hit "Before He Cheats."

Underwood's performance during the in memoriam segment, in which she broke down crying, received acclaim, with many citing it as one of the best and most moving and emotional performances of the night. People.com referred to the performance as "heartbreaking," before describing how Underwood took to the stage to honor country music legends (such as Don Williams, Glen Campbell, Troy Gentry, and Jo Walker-Meador) and the 58 victims of the Las Vegas shooting. In addition, ET called Underwood's performance "beautiful" and "gorgeous," mentioning a statement made by Paisley at the opening of the show about coming together in the face of tragedy.

Garth Brooks, who won the prestigious Entertainer of the Year award, was heavily criticized for lip-syncing during his performance. Of his decision, Brooks stated that "we made a game-time call on whether to sing to a track or lip-sync and we decided to lip-sync it. My voice just isn't going anywhere, and we wanted to represent country music as best we can."

References 

Country Music Association
CMA
Country Music Association Awards
Country Music Association Awards
November 2017 events in the United States
2017 awards in the United States
21st century in Nashville, Tennessee
Events in Nashville, Tennessee